Rod Davis is the name of:

Rod Davis (gridiron football) (born 1981), American gridiron football linebacker
Rod Davis (sailor) (born 1955), American born Olympic sailor who competed for the United States and New Zealand
Rod Davis, member of British skiffle and rock 'n' roll group The Quarrymen

See also
Rodney Davis (disambiguation)
Rod Davies (1930–2015), British astronomer